James Hamilton (1600–1666) was a 17th-century Scottish minister of the Church of Scotland, later active in Ireland until deposed from his living.

Life

He was born in 1600 the second son of Gawen Hamilton, third son of Hans Hamilton, vicar of Dunlop. He was nephew of Viscount Clandeboye in northern Ireland.

After studying at Glasgow University he was appointed by his uncle, James Hamilton, 1st Viscount Claneboye as land agent, overseer and general manager of his estates in Ireland. He attracted the attention of Robert Blair, at that time minister of the church at Bangor, County Down, who persuaded him to enter the ministry. In 1626, despite unorthodox views which resembled Blair's own in regard to episcopacy, he was ordained by Bishop Robert Echlin, and presented by Lord Claneboye to the church at Ballywalter in county Down.

He was there for ten years until Thomas Wentworth and John Bramhall set new terms of church communion to be sworn to in the Church of Ireland. Hamilton did not submit, and his example was followed by other ministers including Edward Brice and John Ridge. Henry Leslie, Echlin's successor, was urged by Bramhall to proceed to their deposition; Leslie challenged them to a public disputation. His challenge was accepted, and Hamilton was chosen to conduct the defence on their behalf. The conference opened on 11 August 1636, in the presence of a large assembly. Bramhall called a halt, and, having obtained an adjournment, persuaded Leslie not to resume it, but to pass sentence on the recalcitrant ministers. On the following day they were deposed. Warrants were issued for their arrest, and Hamilton left for Scotland, where he was appointed minister of the church at Dumfries.

In September 1636 he and other Scots and English puritans to the number of 140 sailed for New England in a ship called the Eagle Wing, which they had built for the purpose. They were chiefly Presbyterians, but some of them inclined to Independency and others to Brownism. There were four Scots ministers on board: Robert Blair, their leader, James Hamilton, John Livingstone and John M'Clellan.

Most histories have no record of his journey to America, and this may have been a different James Hamilton. The next secure record of Hamilton is in 1638 when he joined the Church of Scotland and settled in Dumfries in southwest Scotland.

In September 1642 he was commissioned by the General Assembly of the Church of Scotland to visit Ireland, in order to minister to the Ulster Scots, but returning to Scotland he was in March 1644 appointed by the general assembly to superintend the administration of the solemn league and covenant in Ulster. On his return to Scotland the ship in which he and several others, including his father-in-law, had taken their passage, was captured by the "Harp", a Wexford frigate, commanded by Alaster MacDonnell, who was bringing reinforcements to James Graham, 1st Marquess of Montrose in the Highlands. MacDonnell, who hoped by an exchange of prisoners to secure the release of his father, Colkittagh, then in the hands of Archibald Campbell, 1st Marquess of Argyll, landed his prisoners at Ardnamurchan, and confined them in Mingary Castle. There Hamilton remained for ten months; several of his companions were released, but his father-in-law, the Rev. David Watson, and another minister, Mr. Weir, both died. Exertions of the general assembly and Scottish parliament set him free on 2 May 1645.

He returned to his charge at Dumfries, and was afterwards moved to Edinburgh. Being appointed a chaplain to Charles II by the general assembly, he was taken prisoner on 28 August 1651 at Alyth in Forfarshire by Colonel Matthew Alured and Colonel Morgan, and taken to London, where he was confined for over a year in the Tower of London. Released on 20 November 1652 on Oliver Cromwell's order, he returned to Edinburgh, where he preached until the restoration of the episcopacy in Scotland which drove him from his pulpit. He retired to Inveresk in August 1662, and died at Edinburgh on 10 March 1666.

Family
He married 
(1) Elizabeth, daughter of David Watson, minister of Killeavy, near Newry, Ireland, by whom he had fifteen children; of whom Archibald, minister of Killinchy, who was a leading minister in the Presbyterian church in Ireland, Jane, Mary, Margaret, and Elizabeth, only arrived at maturity
(2) Anna, daughter of Sir James Pringle of Galashiels, and widow of William Inglis, W.S., who in her old age (being 80 years) and poverty on 10 February 1687 presented a petition to the Exchequer ; she was buried 5 September 1691 (Charity Papers)

Bibliography
Hamilton MSS. ed. by T. K. Lowry
Reid's Hist, of the Presbyterian Church in Ireland
Patrick Adair's True Narrative of the Rise and Progress of the Presbyterian Church
McBride's Sample of Jet-Black Prelatic Calumny, Glasgow, 1713
Lives of the Revs. Robert Blair and John Livingstone
Edin. Counc, Canongate (bur.), and Test. Registers
Livingstone's Charac.
Nicoll's, Lamont's, and Brodie's Diaries
Reid's Ireland, Acts of Ass., and Pari.
Reg. Sec. Sig., Peterkin's Rec.
Baillie's Lett., ii., iii.
Stevenson's and Wodrow's Hists., and Select. Biog., i.
Dict. Nat. Biog.

References
Citations

Sources

Attribution

1666 deaths
17th-century Ministers of the Church of Scotland
Irish Presbyterian ministers
Ulster Scots people
Evangelicals from Northern Ireland
1600 births